Pirate Galaxy is a free-to-play, massive multiplayer online game written in Java. Players can operate spaceships, explore vast amount of planets, mine minerals, and fight other players and enemies in the planetary combat. The game features 3D graphics and runs from a downloadable client.

Story 
The game's story revolves around an organization called The Mantis who have conquered many star systems, leaving only a few pilots to recruit others to fight back. 

Players take on the role of a smuggler on the planet Calabash in the Vega system. As the player progresses through the game, they travel to various planets, including Axiom, and eventually join The Colonials, who were previously their enemies. Following a battle with the Mantis mothership, the player gains access to the Antares star system, where they meet the Admiral and help him find his daughter.

Later, the player travels to the Gemini system and meets Isaac, Sara, and the survivors of the war with The Mantis. They then move on to the Mizar system, where they encounter the Baum Arian Fighters, and eventually reach their own star system, Sol, which is now controlled by the Imperials. After a boss battle with Lord Fam Doom, the player gains entrance to the Draconis system, where they meet the Methanides and defeat the Mantis Queen to complete the ancient artifact.

The game's final system, the Sirius Singularity, is accessed through a wormhole that opens after the player experiments with the artifact. This new system is rich with wealth and is inhabited by both the Mantis and rogue Methanide criminals, as well as a new type of NPC called "The Ancients". The latest system, Tau Ceti, has recently been completed with the fourth and final part being released.

Gameplay 
In the game, players take control of any of the large variety of spaceships, perform various tasks such as space exploration, and play many missions. The player must explore the different star systems and planets, upgrade their ship with new technology, and complete various missions to progress through the story.

Starting off on the planet Kalabash in the Vega System, there are a total of eight-star systems and over 30 planets to explore. The star systems are Vega, Antares, Gemini, Mizar, Sol, Draconis, Sirius Singularity, and Tau Ceti. These systems are similar to the stars of the Milky Way.

The Sirius Singularity is a system which needs lot of teamwork in which clan allies have a role to play. The Sirius Singularity has 5 Rings. Rings 1–4 are resource planets, and Ring 5 is an ancient planet from which players get ancient items of other systems. In Sirius Singularity, a jump ship plays a major role to jump to planet by accomplishing missions on 1–4 ring planets and mission not needed to be done to jump from the Ring 5, The player has to jump out of the planet to different ones before the planet collapses and it will be displayed on the planet profile. The planet will collapse, and even the new ones will be automatically made but the names are random.

Reception 
The game generally received favorable reviews.

Awards 
The game received an award at Deutscher Entwicklerpreis 2009 for technical innovation and was nominated at Deutscher Computerspielpreis for best browser-based game of the year.

References

Players Quotes 

 « Prot is nerfed » is a sentence that has been said by a player named "Hecatte".

External links 
 
 Official gamepage
 The Hitchhiker's Guide to Pirate Galaxy

Video games developed in Germany
Browser-based multiplayer online games
Windows games
Java (programming language) software
Browser games
Online games
Freeware games
Space massively multiplayer online role-playing games
Massively multiplayer online role-playing games
2009 video games
Fiction set around Vega
Video games about pirates